Alexis Jones (born May 8, 1994) is an American professional basketball player who played for the Atlanta Dream in the Women's National Basketball Association (WNBA).  She was drafted in 2017 by the Lynx. Born in Midland, Texas, she played college basketball for Duke University, before she transferred to Baylor University.

College career

Duke University
Coming out of high school, Jones was ranked the No. 3 overall recruit by ESPN and signed with Duke. During her freshman season, she started for the Blue Devils at the shooting guard position. When teammate and point guard, Chelsea Gray, went down with an injury, Jones moved over to the point guard position. Following her freshman season, Jones was named to the All-ACC Freshman of the Year, All-Freshman Team, the Norfolk All-Regional Team, and the ACC Tournament MVP. Jones became just the third freshman in ACC history to be named ACC Tournament MVP.

During her sophomore season, Jones started 28 games before tearing her ACL during a game versus Notre Dame. During a game versus Florida State, Jones tied the school record for assists in a single game with 15. She also received Second Team All-ACC status from the coaches for averaging 13.1 ppg, 5.3 apg, and 4.1 rpg, before her injury.

Following her sophomore campaign, Jones announced that she intended to transfer from Duke to be closer to home. Ultimately, Jones decided to transfer to Baylor University.

Baylor University
Due to the NCAA Transfer Rules, Jones sat out the 2014–2015 season for the Baylor Bears. This gave her time to recover from her ACL surgery that she had from her sophomore season.

During her junior season, Jones made her Baylor debut against UT-Arlington, where she recorded 15 points, 5 rebounds, 4 assists, and 2 steals. Her impact was felt right away at Baylor. She started in 34 of 38 games, was one of the three team MVPS, was named the Big 12 Newcomer of the Year, First Team All-Big 12, and was the Most Outstanding Player of the Big 12 Championship Tournament.

During her senior season, Jones once again made an impact on the Baylor season. She finished second in scoring and assists. But once again she had to sit out part of the season due to injury. Jones had gotten a bruised knee that caused her to miss time towards the end of the season. She was able to make it back in time for the NCAA Tournament. Despite the injury, Jones was named to the First Team All-Big 12 Team, which she received unanimously.

Professional career

WNBA

Minnesota Lynx
Jones was selected 12th overall in the 2017 WNBA Draft by the Minnesota Lynx. During Jones's rookie season with the Lynx, she saw limited action playing behind Lindsay Whalen and Renee Montgomery. She began playing more when Whalen went down with a hand injury. She finished the season averaging 2.6 points, 0.8 assists, and 0.8 rebounds per game. She was a member of the 2017 WNBA Championship team.

Los Angeles Sparks
On April 22, 2019, Jones was traded from the Lynx to the Los Angeles Sparks.

Career statistics

College
Source

WNBA

Regular season

|-
|style="text-align:left;background:#afe6ba;"| 2017†
| align="left" | Minnesota
| 29 || 0 || 7.3 || .342 || .379 || .857 || 0.8 || 0.8 || 0.3 || 0.0 || 0.7 || 2.6 
|-
| align="left" | 2018
| align="left" | Minnesota
| 26 || 0 || 8.8 || .352 || .320 || .750 || 0.9 || 0.7 || 0.1 || 0.1 || 0.7 || 3.3
|-
| align="left" | 2019
| align="left" | Los Angeles
| 20 || 1 || 12.2 || .400 || .333 || .800 || 1.1 || 1.8 || 0.3 || 0.2 || 1.4 || 4.0
|-
| align="left" | 2020
| align="left" | Atlanta
| 6 || 0 || 8.8 || .381 || .368 || .500 || 0.0 || 0.8 || 0.5 || 0.0 || 1.0 || 4.0
|-
| align="left" | Career
| align="left" | 4 years, 3 teams
| 81 || 1 || 9.1 || .364 || .344 || .795 || 0.8 || 1.0 || 0.2 || 0.1 || 0.9 || 3.3

Postseason

|-
|style="text-align:left;background:#afe6ba;"| 2017†
| align="left" | Minnesota
| 5 || 0 || 6.0 || .333 || .667 || .000 || 0.8 || 1.4 || 0.0 || 0.0 || 0.4 || 2.4 
|-
| align="left" | 2018
| align="left" | Minnesota
| 1 || 0 || 0.0 || – || – || – || 0.0 || 0.0 || 0.0 || 0.0 || 1.0 || 0.0
|-
| align="left" | 2019
| align="left" | Los Angeles
| 3 || 0 || 9.3 || .375 || .333 || .750 || 1.0 || 0.7 || 0.3 || 0.0 || 1.0 || 3.3
|-
| align="left" | Career
| align="left" | 3 years, 2 teams
| 9 || 0 || 6.4 || .350 || .556 || .500 || 0.8 || 1.0 || 0.1 || 0.0 || 0.7 || 2.4

Personal life
Jones' father, David, is paralyzed from the waist down due to a car accident in 2007 that resulting in their car being flipped three times and Alexis and her brother being thrown from the car. Alexis suffered a broken wrist in the accident.

Her younger brother, Andrew, is currently a guard on the Texas Longhorns men's basketball team.

References

External links
 

1994 births
Living people
American women's basketball players
Atlanta Dream players
Basketball players from Texas
Baylor Bears women's basketball players
Duke Blue Devils women's basketball players
Guards (basketball)
Los Angeles Sparks players
McDonald's High School All-Americans
Minnesota Lynx draft picks
Minnesota Lynx players
Parade High School All-Americans (girls' basketball)
People from Midland, Texas
21st-century American women